Ernakulam is the Central Business District of the city of Kochi in Kerala, India and has lent its name to the Ernakulam district. Many major establishments, including the Kerala High Court, the office of the Kochi Municipal Corporation and the Cochin Shipyard are situated here.

History

Classical history
The region can claim to have played a significant part in fostering the trade relations between Kerala and the outside world in the ancient and medieval period. The early political history of Ernakulam is interlinked with that of the Chera Dynasty of the Sangam age, who ruled over vast portions of Kerala and Tamil Nadu. After the Cheras, the place was later ruled by the Kingdom of Cochin (Perumpadapu Swaroopam).

Princely State of Cochin
Although under British suzerainty (specifically the East India Company) since the Anglo-Dutch Treaty of 1814, Rama Varma XII of the Kingdom of Cochin moved his capital from Mattancherry to Tripunithura in about 1840. Fort Cochin Municipality was established in 1866 under the Madras Town Improvement Act of 1865, and municipal elections were first held in 1883. Ernakulam became a municipality in 1910. In the first state census of 1911, the population of Ernakulam was 21,901; 11,197 Hindus, 9,357 Christians, 935 Muslims, and 412 Jews.

Geography
The Ernakulam District is situated in Central Kerala in India.

Climate
Under the Köppen climate classification, the city of Ernakulam features a Tropical monsoon climate. Since the region lies in the south western coastal state of Kerala, the climate is tropical, with only minor differences in temperatures between day and night, as well as over the year. Summer lasts from March to May, and is followed by the South-west monsoon from June to September. October and November form the post monsoon or retreating monsoon season. Winter from December through February is slightly cooler, and windy, due to winds from the Western Ghats.

The city is drenched in the monsoonal season by heavy showers. The South-west monsoon generally sets in during the last week of May. After July the rainfall decreases. On an average, there are 124 rainy days in a year.

Climate Data
Below is the climate data for Kochi Naval Base, which is situated nearby to Ernakulam.

Economy

As of November 2012, Ernakulam was on target to become the first district in the nation of India to have 100% banking, ensuring that all families, except for voluntary exclusions, hold bank accounts. 

Ernakulam, aka the CBD (Central Business District) of Kochi, has seen high urbanisation in the past few decades, thus turning it into an economic hub of the city. The first traces of this transformation were seen after the MG Road connecting Ravipuram and Kacherippady was opened in 1972. The development took a new shape after the Greater Cochin Development Authority (GCDA) built the Marine Drive to the West of MG Road, in the late 70s. Marine Drive and MG Road thus became the backbone of Kochi's economic activities, and acted as the base for the city to expand in all directions thereafter. Although the current bypass of Ernakulam is quickly becoming the new,

Transport

Road
Ernakulam is a city that is connected to the North-South Corridor National Highway System via the four-laned National Highway 66 as well as National Highway 544.The MC Road starting from Thiruvananthapuram ends in Angamaly.  The highway traverses through the entire length and breadth of the city from different points and provides access to the nearby cities such as Thrissur, Palakkad, Salem and Coimbatore. NH 66 was supposed to be acting as the bypass for Kochi city, but the fast-paced urban expansion of Kochi has meant that the bypass quickly became a city road passing through the middle of it, thereby forcing the NHAI to propose a new bypass for the city. 

The state-owned Kerala State Road Transport Corporation (KSRTC) runs inter-state, inter-district and city services, mostly from the Ernakulam KSRTC bus stand which is the busiest bus stand in Kochi after the Vytilla Mobility Hub. The Kerala State Road Transport Corporation also operates two other bus stations in Ernakulam region of Kochi city, called as "Ernakulam Jetty" and "Thevara Depot".

Railway
The Ernakulam railway station is located close to the city's main shopping area situated on Ernakulam MG Road, and is connected by metro. The Southern Railway Zone of the Indian Railways operates the main rail transport system in Ernakulam.

The Ernakulam Junction Railway Station is a junction and departing station of passengers and express trains, and is the stopping point for trains going towards the south side Alappuzha. Both the North and South railway stations have been selected by the Ministry of Railways to be upgraded to airport-like ones. The redevelopment of the Ernakulam Junction railway station has recently gotten underway.

Air
The Cochin International Airport (in Nedumbassery, Kochi) is about 27 kilometers away from Ernakulam.  

The old civilian airport of Kochi was situated much closer to Ernakulam, at Willingdon Island. It is now formally known as INS Garuda, and is a part of the Southern Naval Command HQ.

Metro
Ernakulam region is connected with the other parts of Kochi city with the Kochi Metro, which was opened in July 2017.
Currently 25.6 km of phase 1 from Aluva to Pettah is open to public while the remaining 2.7 km from Pettah to Tripunithura is under construction. Currently over 70% of the construction of phase 1A to SN Junction has been completed and the stretch is expected to be commissioned by March 2022.

Water
Ernakulam has a number of jetties where passengers can embark and disembark from ferries.  Ferry services connect with Willingdon Island, Mattancherry, Fort Kochi and Mulavukadu, at intervals of 20 minutes.

SWTD (Govt. of Kerala Department) offers cheap ferry service on the following routes:

Media

Print
Major Malayalam newspapers published in Ernakulam include Malayala Manorama, Mathrubhumi, Janmabhoomi, Madhyamam, Deshabhimani, Deepika, Kerala Kaumudi, Thejas, Metro Vartha, Siraj Daily, Varthamanam, Janayugam, Kochi Vartha and Veekshanam.

Popular English newspapers include Deccan Chronicle, The Times of India, The Hindu, and The New Indian Express. A number of evening papers are also published from the city.

Newspapers in other regional languages like Hindi, Kannada, Tamil and Telugu are also sold in large numbers.

Being the seat of the Cochin Stock Exchange, a number of financial publications are also published in the city. These include The Economic Times, Business Line, The Business Standard and The Financial Express.

Prominent magazines and religious publications like the Sathyadeepam and The Week are also published.

Broadcasting

Television
Television stations in Ernakulam include Asianet, Asianet Plus, Asianet News, Zee Keralam, Surya TV, Surya Movies, Surya Music, Surya Comedy Channel, Amrita TV, Media One, Twentyfour News, Jeevan TV, Manorama news, Mathrubhumi News, Janam TV, WE TV, Flowers TV and Reporter TV. DTH services are available through DD Free Dish, airtel digital TV, Dish TV, Sun Direct, Tata Sky, Independent TV (India) and Videocon d2h . The cable operators in Ernakulam are Asianet Digital TV, Siti Cable, Kerala Vision, DEN Networks. The local channels are Asianet Cable Vision, Ernakulam cable TV and Den mtn

Radio
All India Radio has two FM stations in the city, operating at 102.3  MHz AIR Kochi FM and 107.5 MHz. AIR Rainbow FM Private FM radio stations are Radio Mango 91.9, Red FM 93.5, 94.3 Club FM and 104.0 Radio Mirchi. These operate 24 hours a day 7 days a week.

Education
 Universities - Cochin University of Science and Technology, National University of Advanced Legal Studies, Kerala University of Fisheries and Ocean Studies, Sree Sankaracharya University of Sanskrit
 Colleges — Maharajas College, St. Teresa's College, St. Albert's College, Sacred Heart College, Thevara, Cochin University of Science and Technology, St. Paul’s College, Kalamassery, Rajagiri College of Social Sciences, Bharata Mata College, School of Engineering, CUSAT, KMEA Engineering College, Government Medical College, Ernakulam, Government Model Engineering College,De paul institute of Science and Technology, Government Law College, Ernakulam, Union Christian College, Aluva, Viswajyothi College of Engineering and Technology, Federal Institute of Science, Angamaly, National University of Advanced Legal Studies

Politics
Ernakulam assembly constituency is part of Ernakulam (Lok Sabha constituency).

See also
 Aluva
 Angamaly
 Ernakulam district
 Kochi
 Kochukadavanthra
 Places of worship in Ernakulam

References

External links

 Government Portal for Ernakulam City
 Government Portal for the district of Ernakulam
 Ernakulam is India's first smoke-free tourist spot

Kochi
Tourism in Kerala
Cities and towns in Ernakulam district